A pilothouse yacht is one where the design and layout allow the crew to keep a safe and effective watch without having to be on deck. There must be all-round visibility from within the yacht's accommodation – somewhere for a crewmember to keep watch comfortably whilst fully protected from the elements.

Most pilothouse yachts have an inside steering position, but this is not essential provided that it only takes a few seconds to reach the cockpit. If there is no proper inside steering position, there may still be engine controls by the chart table together with an autopilot joystick instead of a wheel.

A wheelhouse is a pilothouse which contains the vessel's main steering position.

References

Boat types